Dezarie is a female roots reggae singer born in St. Croix, U.S. Virgin Islands. She received Atlanta's "Best New Female Reggae Artist" award in 2001 before returning to St. Croix.

She works closely with Midnite. She currently has five albums available. They are entitled Fya (I Grade Records), Gracious Mama Africa, Eaze The Pain, The Fourth Book and her most recent is entitled "Love in Your Meditation".

In 2002 she collaborated with Bambu Station on Talking Roots volume 1 album on song Woe.

Discography 

Fya (2001)

 01. Zion
 02. Omega
 03. Don't Cry
 04. Most High
 05. Love Yourself
 06. Flesh and Bone
 07. Fya
 08. All Ova
 09. Walk Wid Me
 10. Rebel
 11. Jah Throne
 12. Mind Yu Own
 13. Sing Out
 14. Iron Sharpen Iron
 15. Fya Dub

Gracious Mama Africa (2003)

 01. Gone Down
 02. Poverty
 03. Not one penny
 04. Strengthen your mind
 05. Law Fe de Outlaw
 06. Justice
 07. Gracious Mama Africa
 08. Exhalt
 09. Mother and Child
 10. Travelers
 11. Slew dem an done
 12. Judgment come

Eaze The Pain (2008)

 01. Hail Jah
 02. What A Mornin
 03. Always Remember You
 04. Eaze The Pain (Redemption)
 05. Real Luv
 06. Concern
 07. Angels
 08. Set Da Flame
 09. The Truth
 10. Anotha Revolution
 11. For The People By The People
 12. Ras Tafari

The Fourth Book (2010)

 01. Jah Know Better
 02. Tryin To Be God
 03. Ghettos Of Babylon
 04. Everyday
 05. Children Of The Most High
 06. Foolin Yourself
 07. Roots & Culture
 08. Not Yours
 09. Defend Right
 10.  Holy Of Holies

Love in Your Meditation (2014)

 01. Love in Your Meditation
 02. Download De Criminal
 03. Worthy Was She
 04. Not Who We Are To Be
 05. African Heart Lionheart
 06. Return To Sender
 07. Stronger
 08. Keep Praising Jah
 09. How Great Thou Art
 10.  Constructing Destruction
 11. Things Won't Be The Same
 12. Living Ones

External links
Dezarie website This is Dezarie's website.
Review for debut album Fya

People from Saint Croix, U.S. Virgin Islands
Living people
United States Virgin Islands musicians
Year of birth missing (living people)